Mary Fickett (May 23, 1928 – September 8, 2011) was an American actress with roles in the American television dramas The Nurses, The Edge of Night as Sally Smith (1961) and Dr. Katherine Lovell (1967–68), and as Ruth Parker Brent Martin #1 on All My Children (1970–1996; 1999–2000).

Early life and career
Fickett was born in Buffalo, New York and raised in Bronxville, a suburb of New York City. She attended Wheaton College in Massachusetts, and made her theatrical debut in 1946 on Cape Cod. In 1949, she made her Broadway debut appearing in I Know My Love, a comedy starring Alfred Lunt and Lynn Fontanne. Fickett studied acting at New York City's Neighborhood Playhouse under Sanford Meisner and started her television career working on "Television Theatre" programs like Kraft Television Theatre in the 1950s. Her first feature film was Man on Fire alongside Bing Crosby in 1957. In 1958, she received a Tony Award nomination as Best Featured Actress in a Play for her performance as Eleanor Roosevelt in Sunrise at Campobello, opposite Ralph Bellamy.

During the 1960s, she was featured in Calendar, a forerunner to CBS' The Early Show; she appeared alongside host Harry Reasoner.

Personal life
Fickett had two children from her three marriages. Her third and final marriage was to Allen Fristoe (a daytime TV director) from June 1979 until his death in 2008.

All My Children
In January 1970, the American Broadcasting Company launched its new soap opera All My Children, created by Agnes Nixon. Fickett was an original cast member playing Ruth Parker Brent, a nurse at the local hospital and wife of alcoholic car salesman Ted Brent. Her character quickly found an attraction to the widowed Joe Martin (Ray MacDonnell). The pair tried to ignore their attraction until Ruth's husband was killed in a car accident. Ruth married Joe onscreen, and she moved into the Martin house with Joe, mother-in-law Kate, and step-daughter Tara.  Happiness for the new family was shortened by the Vietnam War. Agnes Nixon had always intended for her soap opera to deal with important issues of the day, so to facilitate Richard Hatch exiting the role of Phil Brent his character was drafted into service.

Ruth became an anti-war protester and made some of the first anti-Vietnam speeches aired on American daytime television. This storyline decision, although troubling to television executives at the time, earned Fickett a 1973 Emmy Award for Outstanding Achievement by Individuals in Daytime Drama, the first such award given to a daytime performer. In 1974 she was nominated for the first Daytime Emmy Award for Outstanding Lead Actress in a Drama Series. The storyline involved her son being missing in action. This was another milestone for daytime TV, as it was the first time a war scene was aired on daytime television. The audience saw Phil being hit by a bullet and going down, then carried away by a young Vietnamese boy (played by the adopted son of a friend of Nixon).

Joe and Ruth were happily married, but she later had a friendship with Dr. David Thornton which would jeopardize her marriage.  Ruth and Joe thought that they could not conceive a child together. To have the child they always wanted they began proceedings to adopt Tad Gardner, a child who had been pushed out of a moving vehicle. Joe's son and daughter-in-law found Tad and decided to adopt him, but daughter-in-law Mary was killed, so Ruth and Joe adopted him.  A problem arose when Tad's father, Ray Gardner, arrived in town wanting money and filed a lawsuit to stop the adoption proceedings. He then tried to extort money from the Martin family, in exchange for stopping the lawsuit. Joe refused to do this and kicked him out of his house, but Ruth called him back saying they could "sort things out". Fickett's second controversial storyline started when Ray showed up in a drunken rage and raped Ruth. Fickett received her second Daytime Emmy nomination for this storyline in 1978. Ruth and Joe later had their own son, Joe Martin, Jr. (called Joey), but there was a fear during the pregnancy that the child would have Down syndrome.

Retirement
In the mid-1990s, Fickett decided that she wanted to slow down her schedule and spend more time with her family. She allowed her contract to expire and expected to go on recurring status, meaning she could still appear on the program but did not have to meet any contractual obligations or minimum number of appearances. Negotiations with the producers of the program broke down, and the role of Ruth Martin was recast with Lee Meriwether taking on the character in 1996. In 1999, Meriwether was let go and Fickett rehired on recurring status. She resumed the role of Ruth and supported several front burner storylines including son Tad's romance with Dixie and the breakdown of son Dr. Jake (Joey) Martin's marriage to Gillian. After another year, Fickett decided to call it quits from the busy schedule of soap opera acting and retired in December 2000. In 2002, the producers wanted to bring the character of Ruth back, but Fickett remained in retirement, so Meriwether was rehired and played Ruth whenever the occasion arose.

Health
In 2007, Fickett moved in with her daughter, Bronwyn Congdon, in Colonial Beach, Virginia, where she remained bedridden. Fickett died September 8, 2011, aged 83, at her Callao, Virginia home, from complications of Alzheimer's disease, according to her daughter. ABC dedicated the September 21, 2011 episode of All My Children in Fickett's memory.

References

External links

An update on Mary Fickett, AMC's original Ruth Martin

1928 births
2011 deaths
American film actresses
American soap opera actresses
American stage actresses
Deaths from Alzheimer's disease
Neurological disease deaths in Virginia
Emmy Award winners
Actresses from Buffalo, New York
People from Bronxville, New York
People from Colonial Beach, Virginia
People from Northumberland County, Virginia
21st-century American women